Candida is a 1970 album by Dawn, a studio session group including Tony Orlando, Toni Wine, and Linda November.  Orlando was singing under the group name "Dawn" in order to avoid problems with his contract with his other label, CBS.  However, after the success of the album tracks "Candida" and "Knock Three Times", he invited two other singers to become the real-life "Dawn", and then "Tony Orlando and Dawn" could tour in support of the songs.

Track listing

2005 CD edition

In 2005, a 35th anniversary compilation was released featuring the original track listing plus nine bonus tracks.  The Bonus Tracks are from the group's 1971 second album, "Dawn Featuring Tony Orlando featuring What Are You Doing Sunday" (Bell 6069), later reissued as "Tony Orlando & Dawn II" (Bell 1322) in 1974.

Production
Arranged by Norman Bergen
Produced by Hank Medress, Phil & Mitch Margo and Jay Siegel
Engineered by Billy Radice

References

1970 debut albums
Tony Orlando and Dawn albums
Bell Records albums
Razor & Tie albums